Three Week Hero is an album released by rock singer P.J. Proby on April 8, 1969, by Liberty Records. The album contains a mixture of dramatic pop, blues, rock, and country style songs. While it did not succeed commercially, it is best remembered today as the first time all four members of Led Zeppelin recorded together in the studio. The album was reissued on CD in 1994.

Track listing
All tracks arranged by John Paul Jones; except where indicated
"Three Week Hero" (John Stewart) – 2:56
"The Day That Lorraine Came Down" (Kenny Young) – 3:15
"Little Friend" (Robin Gair, Peter Mason) – 4:01
"Empty Bottles" (Albert Hammond, Mike Hazlewood) – 2:53
"Reflections (Of Your Face)" (Amory Kane; arranged by Reg Tilsley) – 5:14
"Won't Be Long" (J. Leslie McFarland) – 3:41
"Sugar Mama" (Abe Woodley, Kenny Young) – 2:50
"I Have a Dream" (Terry Hensley, Alec Wilder) – 4:45
"It's Too Good to Last" (Baker, Stephens) – 3:14
"New Directions" (Albert Hammond, Mike Hazlewood) – 3:46
"Today I Killed a Man" (Roger Cook, Roger Greenaway) – 3:24
"Medley: It's So Hard to Be a Nigger/Jim's Blues/George Wallace is Rollin' in This Mornin'" (Mable Hillery/Traditional; arranged by Steve Rowland) – 7:38

Personnel
P.J. Proby – vocals

Additional musicians
Stan Barrett – percussion
John Bonham – drums, percussion, conga
Clem Cattini – drums
Alan Hawkshaw – keyboards
The Jericho (The Family Dogg with Bob Henry) – backing vocals on "Won't Be Long" and "I Have a Dream"
John Paul Jones – bass guitar, keyboards, arrangements
Amory Kane  – acoustic guitar, strings
Dennis Lopez – percussion
Jimmy Page – acoustic guitar, electric guitar, pedal steel
Alan Parker – electric guitar
Robert Plant – harmonica, tambourine, backing vocals

Technical personnel
Spencer Leigh – liner notes
Gustav Karl Moody – art direction, cover design
Steve Rowland – arrangement, production
Steve Thomas – art direction
Anthony Lloyd-Parker - photography
Mike Weighell, John Mackswith – engineering

Additional notes
The song "Sugar Mama" recorded by Led Zeppelin at Morgan Studios in 1969, is not the same "Sugar Mama" recorded on this album.

Catalogue: Liberty 83219

References

1969 albums
Led Zeppelin
Liberty Records albums
P. J. Proby albums
Albums arranged by John Paul Jones (musician)
Albums produced by Steve Rowland (record producer)
Albums recorded at Olympic Sound Studios